Michael Polanyi  (11 March 1891 – 22 February 1976) was a Hungarian-British polymath, who made important theoretical contributions to physical chemistry, economics, and philosophy. He argued that positivism supplies an imperfect account of knowing as no observer is perfectly impartial.

His wide-ranging research in physical science included chemical kinetics, x-ray diffraction, and adsorption of gases. He pioneered the theory of fibre diffraction analysis in 1921, and the dislocation theory of plastic deformation of ductile metals and other materials in 1934. He immigrated to Germany, in 1926 becoming a chemistry professor at the Kaiser Wilhelm Institute in Berlin, and then in 1933 to England, becoming first a chemistry professor, and then a social sciences professor at the University of Manchester. Two of his pupils, and his son John Charles Polanyi won Nobel Prizes in Chemistry. In 1944 Polanyi was elected to the Royal Society.

The contributions which Polanyi made to the social sciences include an understanding of tacit knowledge, and the concept of a polycentric spontaneous order to intellectual inquiry were developed in the context of his opposition to central planning.

Life

Early life
Polanyi, born Mihály Pollacsek in Budapest, was the fifth child of Mihály and Cecília Pollacsek (born as Cecília Wohl), secular Jews from Ungvár (then in Hungary but now in Ukraine) and Wilno, then Russian Empire, respectively. His father's family were entrepreneurs, while his mother's father – Osher Leyzerovich Vol (1833 – after 1906) – was the senior teacher of Jewish history at the Vilna rabbinic seminary, from which he had graduated as a rabbi. The family moved to Budapest and Magyarized their surname to Polányi. His father built much of the Hungarian railway system, but lost most of his fortune in 1899 when bad weather caused a railway building project to go over budget. He died in 1905. Cecília Polányi established a salon that was well known among Budapest's intellectuals, and which continued until her death in 1939. His older brother was Karl Polanyi, the political economist and anthropologist, and his niece was Eva Zeisel, a world-renowned ceramist.

Education
In 1909, after leaving his teacher-training secondary school (Minta gimnázium [official name: Budapest-Fasori Evangélikus Gimnázium]). Polanyi studied to be a physician, obtaining his medical diploma in 1914. He was an active member of the Galileo Circle. In the First World War, he served in the Austro-Hungarian army as a medical officer, and was sent to the Serbian front. While on sick-leave in 1916, he wrote a PhD thesis on adsorption.

Career
In October 1918, Mihály Károlyi established the Hungarian Democratic Republic, and Polanyi became Secretary to the Minister of Health. When the Communists seized power in March 1919, he returned to medicine. When the Hungarian Soviet Republic was overthrown, Polanyi immigrated to Karlsruhe in Germany, and was invited by Fritz Haber to join the Kaiser Wilhelm Institut für Faserstoffchemie (fiber chemistry) in Berlin. In 1923 he converted to Christianity, and in a Roman Catholic ceremony married Magda Elizabeth Kemeny. In 1926 he became the professorial head of department of the Institut für Physikalische Chemie und Elektrochemie (now the Fritz Haber Institute). In 1929, Magda gave birth to their son John, who was awarded a Nobel Prize in chemistry in 1986. Their other son, George Polanyi, who predeceased him, became a well-known economist.

His experience of runaway inflation and high unemployment in Weimar Germany led Polanyi to become interested in economics. With the coming to power in 1933 of the Nazi party, he accepted a chair in physical chemistry at the University of Manchester. Two of his pupils, Eugene Wigner and Melvin Calvin went on to win a Nobel Prize. Because of his increasing interest in the social sciences, Manchester University created a new chair in Social Science (1948–58) for him.

Polanyi was among the 2,300 names of prominent persons listed on the Nazis' Special Search List, of those who were to be arrested on the invasion of Great Britain and turned over to the Gestapo.

In 1944 Polanyi was elected a member of the Royal Society, and on his retirement from the University of Manchester in 1958 he was elected a senior research fellow at Merton College, Oxford. In 1962 he was elected a foreign honorary member of the American Academy of Arts and Sciences.

Work

Physical chemistry
Polanyi's scientific interests were extremely diverse, including work in chemical kinetics, x-ray diffraction, and the adsorption of gases at solid surfaces. He is also well known for his potential adsorption theory, which was disputed for quite some time. In 1921, he laid the mathematical foundation of fibre diffraction analysis. In 1934, Polanyi, at about the same time as G. I. Taylor and Egon Orowan, realised that the plastic deformation of ductile materials could be explained in terms of the theory of dislocations developed by Vito Volterra in 1905. The insight was critical in developing the field of solid mechanics.

Freedom and community
In 1936, as a consequence of an invitation to give lectures for the Ministry of Heavy Industry in the USSR, Polanyi met Bukharin, who told him that in socialist societies all scientific research is directed to accord with the needs of the latest Five Year Plan. Polanyi noted what had happened to the study of genetics in the Soviet Union once the doctrines of Trofim Lysenko had gained the backing of the State. Demands in Britain, for example by the Marxist John Desmond Bernal, for centrally planned scientific research led Polanyi to defend the claim that science requires free debate. Together with John Baker, he founded the influential Society for Freedom in Science.

In a series of articles, re-published in The Contempt of Freedom (1940) and The Logic of Liberty (1951), Polanyi claimed that co-operation amongst scientists is analogous to the way agents co-ordinate themselves within a free market. Just as consumers in a free market determine the value of products, science is a spontaneous order that arises as a consequence of open debate amongst specialists. Science (contrary to the claims of Bukharin) flourishes when scientists have the liberty to pursue truth as an end in itself:

[S]cientists, freely making their own choice of problems and pursuing them in the light of their own personal judgment, are in fact co-operating as members of a closely knit organization.
Such self-co-ordination of independent initiatives leads to a joint result which is unpremeditated by any of those who bring it about.
Any attempt to organize the group ... under a single authority would eliminate their independent initiatives, and thus reduce their joint effectiveness to that of the single person directing them from the centre. It would, in effect, paralyse their co-operation.

He derived the phrase spontaneous order from Gestalt psychology, and it was adopted by the classical liberal economist Friederich Hayek, although the concept can be traced back to at least Adam Smith. Polanyi (unlike Hayek) argued that there are higher and lower forms of spontaneous order, and he asserted that defending scientific inquiry on utilitarian or sceptical grounds undermined the practice of science. He extends this into a general claim about free societies. Polanyi defends a free society not on the negative grounds that we ought to respect "private liberties", but on the positive grounds that "public liberties" facilitate our pursuit of objective ideals.

According to Polanyi, a free society that strives to be value-neutral undermines its own justification. But it is not enough for the members of a free society to believe that ideals such as truth, justice, and beauty, are objective, they also have to accept that they transcend our ability to wholly capture them. The objectivity of values must be combined with acceptance that all knowing is fallible.

In Full Employment and Free Trade (1948) Polanyi analyses the way money circulates around an economy, and in a monetarist analysis that, according to Paul Craig Roberts, was thirty years ahead of its time, he argues that a free market economy should not be left to be wholly self-adjusting. A central bank should attempt to moderate economic booms/busts via a strict/loose monetary policy.

In 1940, he produced a film,  "Unemployment and money. The principles involved", perhaps the first film about economics. The film presented a special kind of Keynesianism, neutral Keynesianism, that advised to use budget deficit and tax remissions to increase the amount of money in the circulation in times of economic hardship but did not advise to use infrastructural investments and public works.

All knowing is personal

In his book Science, Faith and Society (1946), Polanyi set out his opposition to a positivist account of science, noting that it ignores the role personal commitments play in the practice of science. Polanyi gave the Gifford Lectures in 1951–52 at Aberdeen, and a revised version of his lectures were later published as Personal Knowledge (1958). In this book Polanyi claims that all knowledge claims (including those that derive from rules) rely on personal judgments. He denies that a scientific method can yield truth mechanically. All knowing, no matter how formalised, relies upon commitments. Polanyi argued that the assumptions that underlie critical philosophy are not only false, they undermine the commitments that motivate our highest achievements. He advocates a fiduciary post-critical approach, in which we recognise that we believe more than we can prove, and know more than we can say.

A knower does not stand apart from the universe, but participates personally within it. Our intellectual skills are driven by passionate commitments that motivate discovery and validation. According to Polanyi, a great scientist not only identifies patterns, but also chooses significant questions likely to lead to a successful resolution. Innovators risk their reputation by committing to a hypothesis. Polanyi cites the example of Copernicus, who declared that the Earth revolves around the Sun. He claims that Copernicus arrived at the Earth's true relation to the Sun not as a consequence of following a method, but via "the greater intellectual satisfaction he derived from the celestial panorama as seen from the Sun instead of the Earth." His writings on the practice of science influenced Thomas Kuhn and Paul Feyerabend.

Polanyi rejected the claim by British Empiricists that experience can be reduced into sense data, but he also rejects the notion that "indwelling" within (sometimes incompatible) interpretative frameworks traps us within them. Our tacit awareness connects us, albeit fallibly, with reality. It supplies us with the context within which our articulations have meaning. Contrary to the views of his colleague and friend Alan Turing, whose work at the Victoria University of Manchester prepared the way for the first modern computer, he denied that minds are reducible to collections of rules. His work influenced the critique by Hubert Dreyfus of "First Generation" artificial intelligence.

It was while writing Personal Knowledge that he identified the "structure of tacit knowing". He viewed it as his most important discovery. He claimed that we experience the world by integrating our subsidiary awareness into a focal awareness. In his later work, for example his Terry Lectures, later published as The Tacit Dimension (1966), he distinguishes between the phenomenological, instrumental, semantic, and ontological aspects of tacit knowing, as discussed (but not necessarily identified as such) in his previous writing.

Critique of reductionism
In "Life's irreducible structure" (1968), Polanyi argues that the information contained in the DNA molecule is not reducible to the laws of physics and chemistry. Although a DNA molecule cannot exist without physical properties, these properties are constrained by higher-level ordering principles. In "Transcendence and Self-transcendence" (1970), Polanyi criticises the mechanistic world view that modern science inherited from Galileo.

Polanyi advocates emergence i.e. the claim that there are several levels of reality and of causality. He relies on the assumption that boundary conditions supply degrees of freedom that, instead of being random, are determined by higher-level realities, whose properties are dependent on but distinct from the lower level from which they emerge. An example of a higher-level reality functioning as a downward causal force is consciousness – intentionality – generating meanings – intensionality.

Mind is a higher-level expression of the capacity of living organisms for discrimination. Our pursuit of self-set ideals such as truth and justice transforms our understanding of the world. The reductionistic attempt to reduce higher-level realities into lower-level realities generates what Polanyi calls a moral inversion, in which the higher is rejected with moral passion. Polanyi identifies it as a pathology of the modern mind and traces its origins to a false conception of knowledge; although it is relatively harmless in the formal sciences, that pathology generates nihilism in the humanities. Polanyi considered Marxism an example of moral inversion. The State, on the grounds of an appeal to the logic of history, uses its coercive powers in ways that disregard any appeals to morality.

Tacit knowledge 
Tacit knowledge, as distinct from explicit knowledge, is an influential term developed by Polanyi in The Tacit Dimension to describe the idea of know-how, the ability to do something without necessarily being able to articulate it or even be aware of all its dimensions: for example, being able to ride a bicycle or play a musical instrument without being able to fully explain the details of how it happens.

Influence and legacy
The literary critic Rita Felski has named Polanyi as an important precursor to the project of postcritique within literary studies.

Bibliography

 1932. Atomic Reactions. Williams and Norgate, London.
 1935. U.S.S.R. Economics
 1940. The Contempt of Freedom. The Russian Experiment and After. Watts & Co., London.
 1944. Patent Reform
 1945. Full Employment and Free Trade
 1946. Science, Faith, and Society. Oxford Univ. Press. . Reprinted by the University of Chicago Press, 1964.
 1951. The Logic of Liberty. University of Chicago Press. 
 1958. Personal Knowledge: Towards a Post-Critical Philosophy. University of Chicago Press. 
 1959. The Study of Man. University of Chicago Press.
 1960. Beyond Nihilism
 1966. The Tacit Dimension. London, Routledge.  (University of Chicago Press. . 2009 reprint)
 1969. Knowing and Being. Edited with an introduction by Marjorie Grene. University of Chicago Press and (UK) Routledge and Kegan Paul.
 1975 (with Prosch, Harry). Meaning. Univ. of Chicago Press. 
 1997. Society, Economics and Philosophy: Selected Papers of Michael Polanyi. Edited with an introduction by R.T. Allen. New Brunswick NJ: Transaction Publishers. Includes an annotated bibliography of Polanyi's publications.

See also
 Credo ut intelligam
 Knowledge management
 List of Christians in science and technology
 Michael Polanyi Center
 George Holmes Howison's "Personal Idealism"

Notes

Further reading

 Allen, R. T., 1991. Polanyi. London, Claridge Press.
 Allen, R. T., 1998. Beyond Liberalism: A Study in the Political Thought of F. A. Hayek and Michael Polanyi, Rutgers, NJ, Transaction Publishers.
 Gelwick, Richard, 1987. The Way of Discovery: An Introduction to the Thought of Michael Polanyi. Oxford University Press.
 Grant, Patrick. "Belief in thinking: Owen Barfield and Michael Polanyi" in Six Modern Authors and Problems of Belief. London: MacMillan 1979.
 Jacobs, Struan, and Allen, R. T. (eds.), 2005. "Emotion, Reason and Tradition: Essays on the Social, Political and Economic Thought of Michael Polanyi", Guildford, Ashgate. .
 Mitchell, Mark, 2006. Michael Polanyi: The Art of Knowing (Library Modern Thinkers Series). Wilmington, Delaware: Intercollegiate Studies Institute. , .
  Neidhardt, W. Jim: "Possible Relationships Between Polanyi's Insights and Modern Findings in Psychology, Brain Research, and Theories of Science." JASA 31 (March 1979): 61–62.
 Nye, Mary Jo, 2011. Michael Polanyi and His Generation: Origins of the Social Construction of Science. University of Chicago Press. .
 Poirier, Maben W. 2002. A Classified and Partially Annotated Bibliography of Michael Polanyi, the Anglo-Hungarian Philosopher of Science. Toronto: Canadian Scholars' Press. .
 Scott, Drusilla, 1995. Everyman Revived: The Common Sense of Michael Polanyi. Grand Rapids, MI: Eerdmans. .
 Scott, William Taussig, and Moleski, Martin X., 2005. Michael Polanyi, Scientist and Philosopher. Oxford University Press. .
 Stines, J. W.: "Time, Chaos Theory and the Thought of Michael Polanyi." JASA 44 (December 1992): 220–27.
 Thorson, Walter R.: "The Biblical Insights of Michael Polanyi." JASA 33 (September 1981): 129–38.

External links

 Biography by Mary Jo Nye
 Polanyi Society home page
 The Society for Personalist and Postcritical Studies The SPCPS and its journal, "Appraisal", takes a special interest in Michael Polanyi. Archived on the Wayback Machine on 19 March 2019
 Polanyi resources at erraticimpact.com
 Polanyiana, Vol. 8, Number 1–2
 Smith, M. K., 2003, "Michael Polanyi and tacit knowledge." The encyclopaedia of informal education
 "Life's Irreducible Structure" . Michael Polanyi. Journal of the American Scientific Affiliation. Volume 22 (December 1970): 123–31.  Links to Responses by Stanford Materials Science Professor Richard H. Bube and another member of the ASA Cohn Duricz.
 
 Guide to the Michael Polanyi Papers 1900-1975 at the University of Chicago Special Collections Research Center

1891 births
1976 deaths
20th-century British male writers
20th-century British philosophers
20th-century Hungarian economists
20th-century essayists
20th-century Hungarian male writers
20th-century Hungarian philosophers
Academics of the University of Manchester
British physical chemists
British film producers
British logicians
British male essayists
British Roman Catholics
Catholic philosophers
Converts to Roman Catholicism from Judaism
Fellows of Merton College, Oxford
Fellows of the American Academy of Arts and Sciences
Fellows of the Royal Society
Hungarian chemists
Hungarian emigrants to England
Hungarian essayists
Hungarian film producers
Hungarian Jews
Hungarian logicians
Hungarian Roman Catholics
Jewish philosophers
Jewish chemists
Jews who immigrated to the United Kingdom to escape Nazism
Naturalised citizens of the United Kingdom
Philosophers of culture
Philosophers of economics
Philosophers of history
Philosophers of logic
Philosophers of mind
Philosophers of religion
Philosophers of science
Philosophers of social science
Philosophy writers
Mihaly
Scientists from Budapest
British social commentators
Hungarian social commentators
Social philosophers
Writers about religion and science
Manchester Literary and Philosophical Society
Member of the Mont Pelerin Society
Max Planck Institute directors